Gryazinsky District is an administrative and municipal district (raion), one of the eighteen in Lipetsk Oblast, Russia. It is located in the southeast of the oblast. Its administrative center is the town of Gryazi. Population:  73,622 (2002 Census);  The population of Gryazi accounts for 56.6% of the district's total population.

References

Notes

Sources

Districts of Lipetsk Oblast